Brave Rabbit 2 Crazy Circus is a 2015 Chinese animated children's adventure comedy film directed by Zeng Xianlin. It was released on January 1.

Voice cast
Xiaoliansha
Dingdang
Hao Xianghai
Wang Xing
Wang Qi
Zhu Rongrong

Reception
By January 7, 2015, the film had earned ¥18.28 million at the Chinese box office.

References

2015 animated films
2015 films
2010s adventure comedy films
2010s children's comedy films
Animated adventure films
Animated comedy films
Chinese animated films
Chinese children's films
2015 comedy films